Puka Puka (Quechua puka red, the reduplication indicates that there is a complex of something, "a complex of red color", also spelled Pucapuca) is mountain in the Cordillera Central in the Andes of Peru which reaches a height of approximately . It is located in the Lima Region, Yauyos Province, on the border of the districts of Alis and  Vitis, north of Alis.

References 

Mountains of Lima Region
Mountains of Peru